Joseph Lister, 1st Baron Lister,  (5 April 182710 February 1912) was a British surgeon, medical scientist, experimental pathologist and a pioneer of antiseptic surgery and preventative medicine. Joseph Lister revolutionised the craft of surgery in the same manner that John Hunter revolutionised the science of surgery.

From a technical viewpoint, Lister was not an exceptional surgeon, but his research into bacteriology and infection in wounds raised his operative technique to a new plane where his observations, deductions and practices revolutionised surgery throughout the world.

Lister's contribution to the fields of physiology, pathology and surgery were four-fold. He promoted the principle of antiseptic surgical care and wound management while working as a surgeon at the Glasgow Royal Infirmary by successfully introducing phenol (then known as carbolic acid) to sterilise surgical instruments, the patient's skin, sutures, the surgeon's hands and the ward. Secondly he researched the role of inflammation and tissue perfusion on the healing of wounds. Thirdly, he advanced diagnostic science by the microscopic analysis of specimens. Fourthly, he devised elegant strategies to increase the chances of survival after surgery. However, his most important contribution was recognising the key principle that underlay the change in surgical practice, namely converting a chance observation into a meaningful application of the scientific principles proposed by Louis Pasteur This was relating Pasteur's germ theory of fermentation to the origin of putrefaction in wounds.

Lister's work led to a reduction in post-operative infections and made surgery safer for patients, distinguishing him as the "father of modern surgery".

Early life
Lister was born to a prosperous, educated Quaker family in the village of Upton, then near but now in London, England. He was the fourth child and second son of four sons and three daughters born to gentleman scientist and wine merchant Joseph Jackson Lister and school assistant Isabella Lister née Harris. On 14 July 1818, the couple were married in a ceremony in Ackworth, West Yorkshire.

Lister's paternal great-great-grandfather, Thomas Lister, was the last of several generations of farmers who lived in Bingley in West Yorkshire. Lister joined the Society of Friends as a young man and passed his beliefs on to his son, Joseph Lister. He moved to London in 1720 to open a tobacconist  in Aldersgate Street in the City of London. His son, John Lister, was born there. Lister's grandfather's was apprenticed to a watchmaker, Isaac Rogers, in 1752 and followed that trade on his own account in Bell Alley, Lombard Street from 1759 to 1766. He then took over his father's tobacco business, but gave it up in 1769 in favour of working at his father-in-law Stephen Jackson's business as a wine-merchant at No 28 Old Wine and Brandy Values on Lothbury Street, opposite Tokenhouse Yard.

His father was a pioneer in the design of achromatic object lenses for use in compound microscopes He spent 30 years perfecting the microscope, and in the process, discovered the Law of Aplanatic Foci, building a microscope where the image point of one lens coincided with the focal point of another. Up until that point, the best higher magnification lenses produced an excessive secondary aberration known as a coma, which interfered with normal use. It was considered a major advance that elevated histology into an independent science. By 1832, Lister's work had built a reputation sufficient to enable his being elected to the Royal Society. His mother, Isabella, was the youngest daughter of master mariner Anthony Harris. Isabella worked at the Ackworth School, a Quaker school for the poor, assisting her widowed mother who was the superintendent of the school.

The eldest daughter of the couple was Mary Lister. On 21 August 1851, she married the barrister Rickman Godlee of Lincoln's Inn and the Middle Temple, who belonged to the Friends meeting house in Plaistow. The couple had six children. Their second child was Rickman Godlee, a neurosurgeon, who became Professor of Clinical Surgery at the University College Hospital. and surgeon to Queen Victoria. He became Lister's biographer in 1917.} The eldest son of Joseph and Isabella Lister was John Lister, who died of a painful brain tumour. With John's death, Joseph became the heir of the family. The couple's second daughter was Isabella Sophia Lister, who married the Irish Quaker Thomas Pim in 1848. Lister's other brother was William Henry Lister, who died after a long illness. The youngest son of the couple was Arthur Lister, a wine merchant, botanist and lifelong Quaker, who studied Mycetozoa. He worked alongside his daughter Gulielma Lister to produce the standard monograph on Mycetozoa. By 1898, Lister's work had built a reputation sufficient to enable his being elected to the Royal Society. Gulielma Lister, a talented artist later updated the standard monograph with colour drawings. Her work built a reputation sufficient to enable her to be elected a fellow of the Linnean Society in 1904, becoming its vice-president in 1929. The couple's last child was Jane Lister; she married Smith Harrison, a wholesale tea merchant, who was marrying for a second time.

After their marriage, the Listers lived at 5 Tokenhouse Yard in Central London for three years until 1822, where they ran a port wine business in partnership with Thomas Barton Beck. Beck was the grandfather of the professor of surgery and proponent of the germ theory of disease, Marcus Beck, who would later promote Lister's discoveries in his fight to introduce antiseptics. In 1822, Lister's family moved to Stoke Newington. In 1826, the family moved to Upton House, a long low Queen Anne style mansion that came with 69 acres of land. It had been rebuilt in 1731, to suit the style of the period.

Education

School
As a child, Lister had a stammer and this was possibly the reason was educated at home until he was eleven. Lister then attended Benjamin Abbott's Isaac Brown Academy, a private Quaker school in Hitchin in Hertfordshire. When Lister was thirteen, he attended Grove House School in Tottenham, also a private Quaker School to study mathematics, natural science, and languages. His father was insistent that Lister received a good grounding in French and German, in the knowledge he would learn Latin at school. From an early age, Lister was strongly encouraged by his father. and would talk about his father's great influence later in life, particularly in encouraging him in his study of natural history.  Lister interest in natural history led him to collect and dissect  small animals, fish and osteology, that were examined using his father's microscope and then be drawn using the camera lucida technique that his father had explained to him, or sketched. His father's interests in microscopical research, developed in Lister the determination to become a surgeon and prepared him for a life of scientific research. None of Lister's relatives were in the medical profession. According to Godlee, the decision to become a physician seemed to be an entirely spontaneous decision.

In 1843 his father decided to send him to university. As Lister was unable to attend either University of Oxford or the University of Cambridge owing to the religious tests that effectively barred him,  he decided to apply to the non-sectarian University College London Medical School (UCL), one of only a few institutions in Great Britain that accepted Quakers at that time. Lister took the public examination in the junior class of botany; a required course that would enable him to matriculate. Lister left school in the spring of 1844, when he was seventeen.

University
In 1844, just before Listers seventeenth birthday, he moved to an apartment at 28 London Road that he shared with Edward Palmer, who was also a Quaker.  Between 1844 and 1845, Lister continued his pre-matriculation studies, on Greek, Latin and natural philosophy. In the Latin and Greek classes, he won a "Certificate of Honour". For the experimental natural philosophy class, Lister won first prize and was awarded a copy of Charles Hutton's "Recreations in Mathematics and Natural Philosophy".

Although his father wanted him to continue his general education, the university had demanded since 1837, that each student obtain a Bachelor of Arts (BA) degree before commencing medical training.  Lister matriculated in August 1845, initially studying for a BA in classics. Between 1845 and 1846, Lister studied the mathematics of natural philosophy, mathematics and Greek earning a "Certificate of Honour" in each class. Between 1846 and 1847, Lister studied both anatomy and atomic theory (chemistry) and won a prize for his essay. On 21 December 1846, Lister and Palmer attended Robert Liston's famous operation where ether was applied by Lister's classmate, William Squire to anaesthetise a patient for the first time. On 23 December 1847, Lister and Palmer moved to 2 Bedford place and were joined by John Hodgkin, the nephew of Thomas Hodgkin who discovered Hodgkin lymphoma. Lister and Hodgkin had been school friends beforehand.

In December 1847, Lister graduated with a degree of Bachelor of Arts 1st division, with a distinction in classics and botany. While he was studying, Lister suffered from a mild bout of smallpox, a year after his elder brother died of the disease. The bereavement combined with the stress of his classes led to a nervous breakdown in March 1848. Lister decided to take a long holiday to recuperate and this delayed the start of his studies. In late April 1848, Lister visited the Isle of Man with Hodgkin and by 7 June 1848 he was visiting Ilfracombe. At the end of June, Lister accepted an invitation to stay in home of Thoman Pim, a Dublin Quaker. Using it as his base, Lister travelled throughout Ireland.  On the 1st July 1848, Lister received a letter full of warmth and love from his father where his last meeting was "...sunshine after a refreshing shower, following a time of cloud" and advised him to "cherish a pious cheerful spirit, open to see and to enjoy the bounties and the beauties spread around us :—not to give way to turning thy thoughts upon thyself nor even at present to dwell long on serious things". From 22 July 1848, for almost a year, the record is blank.

Medical student
Lister registered as a medical student in the winter of 1849.  During his studies, Lister was active in the University Debating Society and the Hospital Medical Society. In the autumn of 1849, he returned to college, bearing a gift of a microscope from his father. After completing courses in anatomy, physiology and surgery, he was awarded "Certificate of Honour's", winning the silver medal in anatomy and physiology and a gold medal in botany.

His main lecturers were John Lindley professor of botany, Thomas Graham professor of chemistry, Robert Edmond Grant  professor of comparative anatomy, George Viner Ellis professor of anatomy and William Benjamin Carpenter professor of medical jurisprudence. Although Lister often spoke highly about Lindley and Graham in his writings, it was Wharton Jones professor of ophthalmic medicine and surgery and William Sharpey professor of physiology, who exercised the greatest influence on Lister. As a student, Lister was greatly attracted by Dr. Sharpey's lectures, which inspired in him a love of experimental physiology and histology that never left him.

Wharton Jones was praised by Thomas Henry Huxley for the method and quality of his physiology lectures. As a clinical scientist working in physiological sciences, he was foremost in the number of discoveries he made. He was also considered a brilliant ophthalmic surgeon, his main field. He conducted research into the circulation of the blood and phenomena of inflammation that was carried out on the frog's web and the bat's wing, and no doubt suggested this method of research to Lister. Sharpey was called the father of modern physiology as he was the first to give a series of lectures on the subject. Prior to that the field has been considered part of anatomy.  Sharpey studied at Edinburgh university, then went to Paris to study clinical surgery under the French anatomist Guillaume Dupuytren and operative surgery under Jacques Lisfranc de St. Martin. It was in Paris that Sharpey met Syme and became life-long friends. After moving to Edinburgh, he taught anatomy with Allen Thomson as his physiological colleague. He left Edinburgh in 1836, in order to become the first Professor of Physiology at University College, London

Clinical instruction

Before he qualified for his degree, Lister had to complete two years of clinical instruction, beginning his residency at University College Hospital in October 1850. He began as an intern and then house physician to Walter Hayle Walshe. professor of pathological anatomy and author of 1846 study, The Nature and Treatment of Cancer. Lister continued his run of academic excellence in 1850 by being awarded "Certificates of Honours" and winning two gold medals in anatomy and silver medals in surgery and medicine.

Then in his second year in 1851, Lister became first a dresser in January 1851 then a house surgeon to John Eric Erichsen in May 1851. Erichsen was professor of surgery and author of the 1853 Science and Art of Surgery described as one of the most celebrated textbooks on surgery in English. The book went through many editions, of which Marcus Beck edited the eighth and ninth editions, adding Lister's antiseptic techniques and Pasteur and Robert Koch's germ theory. His first case notes  were recorded on 5 February 1951. As a dresser, his immediate boss was Henry Thompson who recalled "..a shy Quaker...I remember that he had a better microscope than any man in the college".

Lister had only just begun working in his role as dresser to Erichsen in January 1851, when there was an epidemic of erysipelas in the male ward. An infected patient who came from an Islington workhouse was left in Erichsen's surgical ward for two hours. The hospital had been free of infection but within days there were twelve cases of infection and four deaths. In his notebook, Lister stated that the disease was a form of surgical fever, and particularly noted that recent surgical patients were infected the worst, but those with older operations with suppurating wounds, 'mostly escaped'.  It was while Lister worked for Erichsen, that his interest in the healing of wounds began. Erichsen was a miasmist who thought the wounds were infected from miasma's that came from the wound itself and caused a noxious form of "bad air" that spread to other patients in the war. Erichsen believed that 7 patients with a infected wound had led to saturation of the ward  with "bad air" that spread to cause gangrene. However, Lister took a more rational approach, seeing that some wounds when they were debrided and cleaned, would sometimes heal. He believed that something in the wound itself was at fault.

When he became a house surgeon, Lister had patients put in his charge. For the first time, he came into contact face-to-face with the various forms of blood-poisoning diseases like pyaemia and hospital gangrene, the disease that rots living tissue with a remarkable rapidity. While examining the excision of the elbow of a little boy during the autopsy, who had died of pyaemia, Lister noticed that a thick yellow-pus was present at the seat of the humerus bone, and that distended the brachial and axillary veins. He also noticed the pus advanced in the reverse direction along the veins, bypassing the valves in the veins. He also found suppuration in a knee-joint and multiple abscesses in the lungs. Lister knew that Charles-Emmanuel Sédillot had discovered that multiple abscesses in the lungs were caused by introducing pus into the veins of an animal but at the time couldn't explain the facts but believed the pus in the organs had a metastatic origin. On 2 October 1900, during The Huxley Lecture, Lister described how his interest in the germ theory of disease and how it applied to surgery, began with his investigation into the death of the little boy.

There was an epidemic of gangrene during his surgeoncy. The method to effect a recovery was to chloroform the patient, scrape the soft slough off and burn the necrotic flesh away with mercury pernitrate  Occasionally the treatment would be success but if a grey film appeared at the edge of the wound, then it presaged death. In one patient, the treatment was repeated several times due to it failing, resulting in Erichsen amputating the limb, which healed fine. The evidence that Lister recognised was that disease was a "local poison" and probably parasitic in nature. He examined the diseased tissues under his microscope.  He saw peculiar objects that he could not identify, as he had no frame of reference to draw conclusions from the observations.  In his notebook he recorded:

I imagined they might be the materies morbi in the form of some kind of fungus.

Lister wrote two papers on the epidemics, both were lost. The first paper was on Hospital gangrene  and the second was on the use of the Microscope. They were read to the Student Medical Society at UCL.

Lister's first operation
On 26 June 2013, medical historian Ruth Richardson and orthopaedic surgeon Bryan Rhodes published a paper in which they described their discovery of Lister's first operation, made while both were researching his career. At 1pm on 27 June 1851, Lister was a second-year medical student and working at a casualty ward in Gower Street, conducted his first operation. The operation was on Julia Sullivan, a mother of eight grown children. She had been stabbed in the abdomen by her husband, a drunk and ne'er-do-well, who was taken into custody. On 15 September 1851, Lister was called as a witness to his trial at the Old Bailey. His testimony helped convict the husband, who was transported to Australia for 20 years.

Lister found the woman with a coil of intestine about eight inches across, consisting about a yard of the small intestines, that were damaged in two places, protruding from her lower abdomen. The abdomen itself contained three open wounds. After cleaning the intestines with blood-warm water, Lister was unable to place them back into the body, so he took the decision to extend the cut. They were then placed back in the body, the wounds sewn shut and the abdomen sutured. The patient was administered opium to induce constipation, to enable the intestines to recover. Sulivan recovered her health. It was a full decade before his first public operation in the Glasgow Infirmary.

This operation was missed by historians. Liverpool consultant surgeon John Shepherd, in his essay on Lister, Joseph Lister and abdominal surgery, written in 1968, failed to mention the operation, instead starting his dates from the 1860s onwards. He apparently was unaware of what Lister accomplished.

Microscope experiments 1852

Observations on the Contractile Tissue of the Iris
Lister wrote his first paper while he was still at university. It was considered good enough to be published in the Quarterly Journal of Microscopical Science in 1853.

On 11 August 1852, Lister was presented with piece of a fresh human iris by Wharton Jones, at the University College Hospital. Lister was present at the operation conducted by Jones and took the rare opportunity to study the iris. Lister reviewed the existing research, as well as studying tissue from a horse, a cat, a rabbit and a guinea-pig as well as taking six surgical specimens from patients who underwent a surgical operation on their eye. Lister was unable to complete the research to his satisfaction, due to the need to pass his final examination. He offered an apology in the paper:

The paper advanced the work of Swiss physiologist Albert von Kölliker, demonstrating the existence of two distinct muscles, the dilator and sphincter in the iris, that corrected the convictions of previous researchers that there was no dilator pupillae muscle.

Observations on the Muscular Tissue of the Skin
His next paper was an investigation into goose bumps that was published on 1 June 1853, in the same journal. Lister was able to confirm Kölliker's experimental studies, that in humans the smooth muscle fibres are responsible for the making hair standout from the skin, in contrast to other mammals in which large tactile hairs are associated with striated muscle. Lister demonstrated a new method of creating histological sections from the tissue of the scalp.

Lister's microscopy skills were so advanced that he was able to correct the observations of German histologist, Friedrich Gustav Henle, who mistook small blood vessels for muscle fibres. In each of the papers, he created camera lucida drawings that were so accurate, they could be used to scale and measure the observations.

Both papers attracted significant attention both in Britain and abroad. The naturalist Richard Owen, who was an old friend of Lister's father was particularly impressed by both papers. Owen contemplated recruiting Lister for his own department and forwarded him a thank-you letter on 2 August 1853. Kölliker was particularly pleased at the analysis that Lister had formulated. Kölliker who made many trips to Britain, would eventually meet Lister and became life-long friends. Their close friendship was described in a letter by Kölliker on 17 November 1897, that Rickman Godlee choose to use to illustrate their relationship. Kölliker sent a letter to Lister, when he was president of the Royal Society, congratulating Lister on receiving the Copley medal and fondly remembered his old friends who had died and celebrated his time in Scotland while with Syme and Lister. Kölliker was 80 years old at the time.

Graduation
Lister graduated with Bachelor of Medicine with honours, in the autumn 1852. During his final year, Lister won several prestigious awards, that were heavily contested among the student body of the London teaching hospitals. He won the Longridge Prize

that included a £40 stipend. He was also awarded a gold medals in Structural and Physiological Botany. Lister obtained two of the four available gold medals in Anatomy and Physiology as well as surgery, that came with a medal scholarship of £50 a year, for two years, for his second examination in medicine. In the same year, Lister passed the examination for the fellowship of the Royal College of Surgeons, bringing to a close nine years of education.

With his medical education completed, Sharpey advised Lister to spend a month at the medical practice of his lifelong friend James Syme in Edinburgh and then visit medical schools in Europe for a longer period for training. Sharpey himself had been taught first in Edinburgh and later Paris. Sharpey had met Syme, a teacher of clinical surgery, who was widely considered the best surgeon in the United Kingdom while he was in Paris. Sharpey had gone north to Edinburgh in 1818, along with many other surgeons since, due to the influence of John Hunter.  Hunter had taught Edward Jenner who is seen as the first surgeon to take a scientific approach to the study of medicine, that was known as the Hunterian method Hunter was an early advocate for careful investigation and experimentation, using the techniques of pathology and physiology to give himself a better understanding of healing than many of his colleagues. For example, his 1794 paper, A treatise on the blood, inflammation and gun-shot wounds was the first systematic study of swelling, discovering that inflammation was common to all diseases. Due to Hunter, surgery was raised from a job then practiced by hobbyists or amateurs into a true scientific profession. As the Scottish universities taught medicine and surgery from a scientific viewpoint, surgeons who wished to emulate those techniques travelled north for training. Scottish universities had several other features that distinguished them from the medical universities in the south. They were inexpensive and didn't require religious admissions tests, attracting the most scientifically progressive students in Britain. The most important differentiator, was that medical schools in Scotland had evolved from a scholarly tradition, where English medical schools relied on hospitals and practice. Experimental science had no practitioners at English medical schools and while Edinburgh University medical school was large and active at the time, southern medical schools were generally moribund, their laboratory space and teaching materials being inadequate. English medical schools tended to view surgery as manual labour, not a respectable calling for a gentleman academic.

Surgical profession 1854
Before Lister's studies of surgery, many people believed that chemical damage from exposure to "bad air", or miasma, was responsible for infections in wounds. Hospital wards were occasionally aired out at midday as a precaution against the spread of infection via miasma, but facilities for washing hands or a patient's wounds were not available. A surgeon was not required to wash his hands before seeing a patient; in the absence of any theory of bacterial infection, such practices were not considered necessary. Despite the work of Ignaz Semmelweis and Oliver Wendell Holmes Sr., hospitals practised surgery under unsanitary conditions. Surgeons of the time referred to the "good old surgical stink" and took pride in the stains on their unwashed operating gowns as a display of their experience.

Edinburgh 1853–1860

James Syme
Syme was a well-established clinical lecturer at Edinburgh University for more than two decades before he met Lister. Syme was considered the boldest and most original surgeon then living in Great Britain. He became a surgical pioneer during his career, preferring simpler surgical procedures as he detested complexity, in the era that immediately preceded the introduction of anesthesia.

In September 1823, at the age of 24, Syme made a name for himself by first performing an amputation at the hip-joint, the first time in Scotland. Considered the bloodiest operation in surgery, Syme completed it in less than a minute,  as speed was essential in a time before anesthesia. Syme became widely known and acclaimed for his development of a surgical operation that became known as Syme amputation, amputation at the level of the ankle-joint, where the foot is removed and the heel pad is preserved. Syme was considered a scientific surgeon, as evidenced by his paper On the Power of the Periosteum to form New Bone, and became one of the first advocates of antiseptics.

Arrival in Edinburgh
In September 1853, Lister arrived in Edinburgh bearing letters of introduction from Sharpey to Syme. Lister was anxious about his first appointment but decided to settle in Edinburgh after meeting Syme who embraced him with open arms, invited him to dinner and offered him an opportunity to assist in his private operations.

Lister was invited to his Syme's house, Millbank, in Morningside (now part of Astley Ainslie Hospital), where he met, amongst others, Agnes Syme, Syme's daughter by another marriage and granddaughter of the physician Robert Willis. While Lister thought that Agnes was not conventionally pretty, he admired her quickness of mind, her familiarity with medical practice, and her warmth. Lister became a frequent visitor to Millbank and met a much wider group of eminent people than he would have in London.

In the same month, Lister began work as an assistant to Syme at the University of Edinburgh In a letter to his father, Lister was surprised at the size of the Infirmary and spoke about his impressions of Syme, "..is larger than I expected to find it; there are 200 Surgical beds, and a large number in other departments. At University College Hospital there were only about 60 Surgical beds, so altogether a prospect appears to be opening of a very profitable stay here. ...Syme is, I suppose, the first of British surgeons, and to observe the practice and hear the conversation of such a man is of the greatest possible advantage". By October 1853, Lister decided to spend the winter in Edinburgh. Syme was so impressed by Lister, that after a month Lister became Syme's supernumerary house surgeon at the Royal Infirmary of Edinburgh and his assistant in his private hospital at Minto House in Chambers Street. As house surgeon, he assisted Syme during every operation, taking notes. It was a much coveted position and gave Lister the option of choosing which of the ordinary cases he would attend. During this period, Lister presented a paper at the Royal Edinburgh Medico-Chirurgical Society on the structure of cancellous exostoses that had been removed by Syme, demonstrating that the method of ossification of these growths was the same as that which occurs in epiphyseal cartilage.

In September 1854, Lister house surgeoncy appointment was finished. With the prospect of being out of a job, he had spoken to his father about seeking a position at the Royal Free Hospital in London. However, Sharpey had written to Syme, warning him that it was unlikely that Lister would be welcome at the Royal Free as it was he would have likely eclipsed Thomas H. Wakley, whose father held considerable sway at the hospital. Lister then planned to tour Europe for a year. However an opportunity presented itself, when the noted infirmary surgeon and surgical lecturer at the Edinburgh Extramural School of Medicine Richard James Mackenzie had died. Mackenzie had been seen as a successor to Syme but had contracted cholera in Balbec in Scutari, Istanbul, while on a four-month volunteer sabbatical as field surgeon to the 79th Highlanders during the Crimean War. Lister took advantage of the situation and proposed to Syme that he take over Mackenzie's position to become assistant surgeon to Syme. Syme initially rejected the idea as Lister wasn't licensed to operate in Scotland, but later warned to the idea. In October 1854, Lister was appointed a lecturer Lister successfully transferred the lease held by Mackenzie at his lecture room at 4 High School Yards, to himself. On 21 April 1855, Lister was elected a Fellow of the Royal College of Surgeons of Edinburgh and two days later, rented a house at 3 Rutland Square for living. In June 1855, Lister made a hurried trip to Paris to take a course on operative surgery on the dead body and returned in June.

Extra-mural lecturing

On 7 November 1855, Lister gave his first extramural lecture on the "Principles and Practice of Surgery", in a lecture theatre at 4 High School Yards known as Old Jerusalem and directly located across from the Infirmary.  His first lecture was read from 21 pages of foolscap folio. Lister's first lectures were based on notes, either read or spoken, but over time he used them less and less  becoming extempore in his speech, slowly and deliberately forming his argument as he went along. By this deliberate way of speaking, he managed to overcome a slight, occasional stammer which, in his early days, had been more pronounced.

His first student was John Batty Tuke, in a class of nine or ten, mostly consisting of dressers. Within a week, twenty-three people had joined. In the next year, only eight folk turned up. In the summer of 1858, Lister had the ignominious experience of reading his lecture to a single student, who arrived ten minutes late. Seven more students arrived later.

His first lecture focused on the concept of surgery, stating a definition of disease that linked it to the Hippocratic Oath. He then explained that surgery could have more benefits than medicines, that could only comfort the patient at best. He then explained the attributes a good surgeon should exhibit, before finishing the lecture by recommending Syme's book "Principles of Surgery". Lister completed 114 lectures that followed a standard syllabus. Lecture VII described his earliest experiment on inflammation when he put mustard on his arm and watched the results. Lecture IV to IX dealt with the circulation of blood. Inflammation was discussed in lectures X to XIII. The second half of the course dealt with clinical surgery. For the last 4 days, he gave 2 lectures a day, in order to complete the event before his marriage, with the first course ending on 18 April 1856. In the summer of 1858, Lister started a second, completely separate course, where he lectured on surgical pathology and operative surgery.

Marriage
By mid-summer 1854, Lister realised that  he was attracted to Agnes Syme and he started to court her. Lister wrote to his father and mother about his love but both his parents were concerned about the union, particularly concerning the fact he was Quaker and Agnes have no indication that she was going to change her denomination.  During that time, when a Quaker married a person of another denomination, it would be considered as marrying out of the society. Lister was determined to marry Agnes and sent a further  letter to his father, asking his father if his financial support would continue should Lister and Agnes become married. Lister's father replied that Agnes not being in the Society of Friends wouldn't affect his pecuniary arrangements. Joseph Jackson offered his son extra money to buy furniture and suggested that Syme would offer a dowry and that he would negotiate with Syme directly on it   His father suggested that Lister should voluntarily resign from the Society of Friends. Lister made up his mind and subsequently left the Quakers to become a protestant, later joining the congregation of the Saint Paul's Episcopal Church, in Jeffrey Street, Edinburgh. In August 1855, Lister became engaged to Agnes Syme. On 23 April 1856, Lister married Agnes Syme in the drawing room of Millbank, Syme's house in Morningside. Agnes's sister stated that this was out of consideration of any Quaker relations.  Only the Syme family were present. The Scottish physician and essayist John Brown toasted the couple after the reception.

On their honeymoon, the couple spent a month at Upton and the Lake District, followed by three months on a tour of the leading medical institutes in France, Germany, Switzerland, and Italy. The couple returned in October 1856. By this time, Agnes was enamoured of medical research and became Lister's partner in the laboratory for the rest of her life. When they returned to Edinburgh, the couple moved into a rented house at 11 Rutland Street in Edinburgh. The house was situated over three floors with a study on the first floor, that was converting into a consulting room for patients and a room with hot and cold taps on the second floor that became his laboratory. The Scottish surgeon Watson Cheyne, who was almost a surrogate son to Lister, stated after his death that Agnes had entered into her work wholeheartedly, had been his only secretary, and that they discussed his work on an almost equal footing.

Lister's books are full of Agnes' careful handwriting.  Agnes would take dictation from Lister, taken at hours at a stretch. Spaces would be left blank amongst the reams of Agnes' handwriting for small diagrams, that Lister would create using the camera lucida technique and Agnes would later paste in.

Assistant surgeoncy
On 13 October 1856, he was unanimously elected to the position of Assistant Surgeoncy at Edinburgh Royal Infirmary.

Contributions to physiology and pathology 1853–1859
While he was in Edinburgh, Lister conducted a series of physiological and pathological experiments between the years 1853 and 1859. His approach was rigorous and meticulous in both measurement and description. Lister was clearly aware of the latest advances of physiological research in France, Germany, and other European countries and maintained an on-going discussion of his observations and results with other leading physicians in his peer group including Albert von Kölliker, Wilhelm von Wittich, Theodor Schwann, and Rudolf Virchow and ensured he correctly cited their work.

Lister's primary instrument of research was his microscope and his primary research material were frogs. Before his honeymoon, the couple had visited his uncle's house in Kinross. Lister had taken his microscope and captured several frogs, intending to use them in the study of inflammation, but they escaped. When he returned from his honeymoon, he used frogs captured from Duddingston Loch in his experiments. Lister carried out his experiments in his laboratory and in the veterinary college abattoir on animals that were either dead or when they were chloroformed. If Lister was using a frog they were pithed, to deprive them of sensation. He also used bats, sheep, cats, rabbits, oxen and horses in his experiments. Lister was tireless in his pursuit of knowledge and this is illustrated by Thomas Annandale, his assistant who stated:

"I confess that on more than one occasion our patience was a little tried by the long hours were thus engaged, and more particularly when the dinner hour was many hours overdue, but no one could work with Mr. Lister without imbibing some of his enthusiasm"

These experiments resulted in the publication of eleven papers between 1857 and 1859. They included the study of the nervous control of arteries, the earliest stages of inflammation, the early stages of coagulation, the structure of nerve fibres, and the study of the nervous control of the gut with reference to sympathetic nerves. He continued the experiments for three years, until he was appointed to a position at the University of Glasgow.

1855 Beginning of inflammation research
In a letter dated 16 September 1855, Lister recorded the beginnings of his research into inflammation, six weeks before his lectures were to begin. Inflammation was subject that would preoccupy him for the rest of his life. Later in life, Lister stated that he considered his research into the nature of inflammation to be an "essential preliminary" to his conception of the antiseptic principle and insisted these early findings be included in any memorial volume of his work. In 1905, when he was seventy eight years old, he wrote,

"If my works are read when I am gone, these will be the ones most highly thought of"

Inflammation is defined by four symptoms, heat, redness, swelling and pain. For surgeons prior to Lister, this meant the arrival of suppuration or putrefaction, meaning local or general infection. As the germ theory of disease had not been discovered, infection as a concept didn't exist. However, Lister knew that the phenomena of the slowing of the blood through the capillaries seemed to precede inflammation. Joseph Jackson Lister had written a paper with Thomas Hodgkin that described how blood cells behaved prior to a clot, i.e. specifically how the concave cells fitted themselves together into stacks. Lister knew that to observe the next step, it was important that the tissue remain alive so the blood vessels could be observed through the microscope.

In September 1855, Lister first experiment was on the artery of a frog viewed under his microscope, which was subjected to a water droplet of differing temperatures, to determine the early stage of inflammation. The blood slowed down then coagulated. He continued the experiment on the wing of chloroformed bat to widen his research focus. Lister concluded that the contraction of the vessels lead to the exclusion of blood cells from the capillaries, not their arrest and blood serum continued to flow. This was his first independent discovery.

The experiments ceased between October 1855 and continued in September 1856 when the couple moved into Rutland Square. Lister started with mustard as an irritant, then Croton oil, acetic acid, oil of Cantharidin and chloroform and many others. They led to the production of three papers. His first paper grew out of need to prepare for this extramural lectures and had begun the year before, continuing in development for six weeks, after he moved into Rutland street. The early paper titled: "On the early stages of inflammation as observed in the Foot of a Frog" was read to the Royal College of Surgeons of Edinburgh on 5 December 1856. The last third was read out extempore.

1856 Beginning of coagulation research
Listers research into the process of coagulation was the second major area of investigation that he conducted during this period. He had observed during inflammation in certain cases of septicaemia, that it affected the blood vessels lining leading to intravascular blood clotting, that led to putrefaction and secondary haemorrhage in wounds.  Beginning with a simple experiment in December 1856 that was described in a note by Agnes, where he pricked his own finger to observe the process of coagulation,   it led to five physiology papers on coagulation between 1858 and the last in 1863.

There were several competing theories that explained the occurrence of a blood clot, and although the theories were largely abandoned, it was still thought that blood contained a liquifying agent, i.e. fibrin held in a solution of ammonia that became known as the "Ammonia theory".

In 1824, Charles Scudamore had proposed carbonic acid as the solution. The prevailing theory was from Benjamin Ward Richardson, who won the 1857 Astley Cooper triennial prize for his essay, where he postulated that blood remained liquid due the presence of ammonia.  In the same year, Ernst Wilhelm von Brücke proposed that the vital actions of the vessels inhibited the bloods natural tendency to coagulate.

1856 On the minute structure of involuntary muscle fibre
Lister's third paper was published in 1858 in the same journal and was read before the Royal Society of Edinburgh on 1 December 1856. It was research into the histology and function of the minute structures of involuntary muscle fibres. The experiment was conducted in the autumn of 1856, and was designed to confirm Kölliker's observations on the structure of individual muscle fibres. Kölliker description had been criticised as he had used needles to separate the tissue, to observe the individual cells, so his critics stated that he had observed artefacts for the experiment rather than the real muscle cells. Lister proved conclusively that the muscle fibres of blood vessels, described by Lister as slightly flattened elongated elements, were similar to those found by Kölliker in pig intestine, but were wrapped spirally and individually, around the innermost membrane. He stated that the different variations in shape, from long tubular bodies with pointed ends and elongated nuclei to short "spindles" with squat nuclei, were due to different phases of the contraction. During "The Huxley Lecture" he stated he couldn't imagine a more efficient mechanism being used to constrict these vessels.

1857 On the flow of the lacteal fluid in the mesentery of the mouse
His next paper,  was a short report, based on observations that he made in 1853. This first experiment by Lister, as opposed to purely microscope work, was to prove two goals: firstly to determine the nature of the flow of chyle in the lymphatics and secondly, to determine if the lacteals in the gastrointestinal wall could absorb solid matter, in the form of granules, from the lumen. For the first experiment, a mouse that was fed beforehand on bread and milk was chloroformed then had its abdomen opened and a length of intestine placed on glass under a microscope. Lister repeated the experiment several times and each time saw mesenteric lymph flowing in a steady stream, without visible contractions of the lacteals. For the second experiment Lister dyed some bread with indigo dye and fed it to a mouse, with the result that no indigo particles were ever seen in the chyle. Lister delivered the paper to the 27th meeting of the British Medical Association, that was held in Dublin between 26 August to 2 September 1857. The paper was formally published in 1858 in the Quarterly Journal of Microscopical Science.

Seven papers on the origin and mechanism of inflammation
In 1858, Lister published seven papers on physiological experiments he conducted on the origin and mechanism of inflammation. Two of these papers were research into the neural control by the nervous system of blood vessels, "An Inquiry Regarding the Parts of the Nervous System Which Regulate the Contractions of the Arteries" and "On the Cutaneous Pigmentary System of the Frog", while the third and the principal paper in the series was titled: "On the Early Stages of Inflammation", which extended the research by Wharton Jones. The three papers were read to the Royal Society of London on 18 June 1857. They had originally been written as one paper and had been sent to Sharpey, John Goodsir and the English pathologist James Paget for review.  However, Paget and Goodsir both recommended that is should be published as three separate papers.

1858 An Inquiry Regarding the Parts of the Nervous System Which Regulate the Contractions of the Arteries
The first of these series of experiments was designed to satisfy a contemporary dispute between physiologists, concerning the origin of the influence exercised over blood vessel diameter (calibre) by the sympathetic nervous system. The dispute began when Albrecht von Haller formulated a new theory known as Sensibility and Irritability in his 1752 thesis De partibus corporis humani sensibilibus et irritabilibus. The dispute had been debated since the middle of the 18th century. Haller put forward the view that contractability was a power inherent in the tissues which possessed it, and was fundamental fact of physiology. It concerned the property of irratability, the supposed automatic response of muscular tissue, especially visceral tissue, to external stimulus, that caused them to contract when stimulated.  Even as late as 1853, highly respected textbooks, for example William Benjamin Carpenter Principles of Human Physiology stated the doctrine of 'irritability' was a fact beyond dispute. and was still considered contentious when John Hughes Bennett created the Physiology article for the 8th edition of Encyclopædia Britannica in 1859.

In his experiments that he started in the autumn of 1856, Lister used a microscope fitted with ocular micrometer to measure the diameter of blood vessels in a frogs web. In a before and after experiment, he ablated parts of the central nervous system and also before and after, with the splitting of the sciatic nerve. Lister concluded that blood vessel tone was controlled by the medulla oblongata and the spinal cord. This refuted Wharton's conclusions, in his paper Observations on the State of the Blood and the Blood-Vessels in Inflammation. who was not able to confirm that the control of blood vessels of the hind legs was dependent upon spinal centres.

1858 On the Cutaneous Pigmentary System of the Frog
The second part of the original paper that was an experiment into the nature and behaviour of pigment. It had been known for some years that the skin of the frog is capable of varying in colour under different circumstances. The first account of this mechanism and how it is affected had been first described by Ernst Wilhelm von Brücke of Vienna in 1832 and later investigated further by Wilhelm von Wittich in 1854 and Emile Harless in 1947.

Lister had seen how the beginning of inflammation was always accompanied by a change of colour in the frogs web. He determined that the pigments consisted of "very minute pigment-granules" that are contained in a network of stellate cells, the branches of which, subdividing minutely and anastomosing freely with one another and with those of neighbouring cells, constitute a delicate network in the substance of the true skin. It had been supposed that the concentration and diffusion of the pigment depended upon the contraction and extension of the branches of the star-shaped cells in which it was contained; and that only these movements of the cells were under the influence of the nervous system.  At the time, there was no cell theory of matter nor was they're any dyes or fixatives that could used to enhance experimental discovery. Indeed, Lister wrote of this, stating "The extreme delicacy of the cell wall makes it very difficult to trace it among the surrounding tissue".  Lister observed that it was the pigment granules themselves and not the cells that moved, and that this movement is not merely brought about by the control of the nervous system, but that it may be caused by the direct action of irritants on the tissues themselves. He believed that pigment reflected the activity of blood vessels, though it was the slowing of blood flow that initiates the process of inflammation.

1858 On the early stages of inflammation
The focal study was the longest paper of the three and the last to be published.  Like many of his colleagues, Lister was aware that inflammation was the first stage of many postoperative conditions and that excessive inflammation often preceded the onset of a septic condition. Once that happened, the patient would develop a fever.  Lister had come to the conclusion that accurate knowledge of the functioning of inflammation could not be obtained by researching the more advanced stages that were subject to secondary processes. He therefore started, in quite a different way from that of almost all his predecessors by directing his enquiry to the very first deviations from health, hoping to find in them "the essential character of the morbid state most unequivocally stamped". Essentially, Lister performed these experiments to discover the causes of erythrocyte  adhesiveness. As well as experimenting on frogs web and bats wing, Lister used blood that he had obtained from the end of his own finger that was inflamed and compared it against blood from one of his other fingers. He discovered that after something irritating had been applied to living tissues which did not kill them outright firstly the blood-vessels contracted and their lumen became very small; the part became pale. Secondly, the vessels after an interval, dilated and the part became red. Thirdly, some of the blood in the most injured blood-vessels slowed down in its flow and coagulated. Redness occurred which, being solid, could not be pressed away. Lastly, the fluid of the blood passed through the vessel walls and formed a " blister " about the seat of injury. He found that each tiny artery was surrounded by a muscle, which enables it to contract and dilate. He found further that this contraction and dilation was not an individual act on its part, but was an act dictated to it by the nervous cells in the spinal cord.

The paper was divided into four sections:
 The aggregation of red blood cells when removed from the body, i.e., which occurs during coagulation.
 This section deals with the aggregation of the cells of the blood, which occurs during the process of clotting. It shows that when blood is removed from the body this aggregation depends on their possessing a certain degree of mutual adhesiveness, which is much greater in the white blood cells than in the red blood cells. This property, though apparently not depending upon vitality, is capable of remarkable variations, in consequence of very slight chemical changes in the blood plasma.
 The structure and function of blood vessels.
 This section shows that the arteries regulate, by their contractility, the amount of blood transmitted in a given time through the capillaries, but that neither full dilatation, extreme contraction, nor any intermediate state of the arteries, is capable per se of producing accumulation of blood cells in the capillaries.
 The effects of irritants on blood vessels, e.g., hot water.
This section details how the effects are two-fold
 firstly, a dilatation of the arteries (commonly preceded by a brief period of contraction), which is developed through the nervous system and is not confined to the part brought into actual contact with the irritant, but implicates a surrounding area of greater or less extent; and
 secondly, an alteration in the tissues upon which the irritant directly acts, which makes them influence the blood in the same manner as does ordinary solid matter. This imparts adhesiveness to both the red and the white blood cells, making them prone to stick to one another and to the walls of the vessels, and so gives rise, if the damage to the tissues be severe, to stagnation of the blood flow and ultimately to obstruction.
 The effects of irritants on tissue.
 The fourth section describes the effects of irritants upon the tissues. It proves that those which destroy the tissues when they act powerfully, produce by their gentler action only a condition bordering on loss of vitality, i.e. a condition in which the tissues are incapacitated, but from which they may recover, provided the irritation has not been too severe or protracted.

Lister's paper was able to show that capillary action is governed by the constriction and dilation of the arteries. The action is affected by trauma, irritation or reflex action through the central nervous system. He noticed that although the capillary walls lack muscle fibres, they are very elastic and are subject to significant capacity variations that are influenced by arterial blood flow into the circulatory system. Drawings made with a camera lucida were used to depict the experimental reactions. They displayed vascular stasis and congestion in the early stages of the body's reaction to damage. According to Lister, vascular alterations that were initially brought on by reflexes occurring within the nervous system were followed by changes that were brought on by local tissue damage. In the conclusions to the paper,  Lister linked his experimental observations to physical clinical conditions, for example skin damage resulting from boiling water and trauma occurring after a surgical incision.

After the paper was read to the Royal Society in June 1857, it was very well received and his name became known outside Edinburgh.

On a Case of Spontaneous Gangrene from Arteritis, and on the Causes of Coagulation of the Blood in Diseases of the Blood-Vessels
Listers first paper is an account of a case of spontaneous gangrene in a child. The paper on coagulation was read before the Medico-Chirugical Society of Edinburgh on the 18 March 1858. In an account written by Agnes, she states that there was no one at the medical school meeting who was capable of appreciating it, and the remarks made upon it were very poor. There was  suggestions for improvement which Lister threw out. There was lots of cheering, proclaiming it a great success. The paper was written-up at 7pm, with Lister dictating and Agnes writing it during a 50-minute session, followed by the exposition to the society at George Street hall at 8pm.

Lister first used the amputated legs from sheep and discovered that blood remained liquid in the blood vessels for up to six days and still underwent coagulation, albeit more slowly when the vessel was opened. He also noticed that if vessels remained fresh, the blood would remain fluid. In later experiments he moved to cats. He tried to emulate an inflamed blood vessel by exposing the jugular vein of the animal and applying irritants then constricting and opening the flow, to measure the effect. He noticed that in the damaged vessel the blood would coagulate He eventually came to the conclusion that if there was ammonia in the blood, it was much less important than the condition of the vessel in stopping coagulation. He tested his hypothesis on three cadavers by examining the condition of various veins and arteries and found he was correct. He also concluded that the Ammonia theory didn't apply to vessels in the body, but it could apply to blood outside the body. While that was incorrect, his other conclusions were accurate. Specifically that inflammation in the blood vessel lining, results in coagulation occurring. Lister realised that vascular occlusion increased the pressure through the network of small vessels, leading to the formation of "liquor sanguinis" that lead to further localised damaged perfusion. Certainly, Lister had no knowledge of the coagulation cascade but his experiments contributed to the current understanding of clotting, the final product of coagulation.

Lister continued experimenting in April, examining vessels and blood from a horse. This resulted in another communication to the society on 7 April. His work in coagulation continued until the end of year. Lister's second paper on coagulation was published in August 1958 and titled: "Case of Ligature of the Brachial Artery, Illustrating the Persistent Vitality of the Tissues". It was a short two page paper where he described saving a patients arm from being amputated which had been constricted by a tourniquet for thirty hours, using the knowledge of coagulation that he had discovered in the previous months.

1858 Preliminary account of an inquiry into the functions of the visceral nerves
Lister continual interest in the nervous control of blood vessels led him to conduct a series of experiments during June and July 1858, where he researched the nervous control of the gut. The research was published in the form of three letters sent to Sharpey. The first two letters were sent on 28 June and 7 July 1858  The last letter was published as the "Preliminary Account of an Inquiry into the Functions of the Visceral Nerves, with special reference to the so-called Inhibitory System.".

He had been studying the work of Claude Bernard, LJ Budge and Augustus Waller and had become interested in what was known as "sympathetic action", where inflammation appeared in a different area from the source of irritation. This led him to study Pflüger's 1857 paper titled "About the inhibitory nervous system for the peristaltic movements of the intestines",  proposed that the splanchnic nerves instead of exciting the intestine muscle layer that they are connected to, inhibit their movement. The German physiologist Eduard Weber made the same claim. Pflüger had named these inhibitory nerves "Hemmungs-Nervensystem", a name that Syme, at Listers request thought they should be translated as inhibitory nervous system. Lister dismissed Pflüger's idea of inhibitory nerves as not only implausible but not supported by observation, as a mild stimulus caused increased muscle activity which changed to a decreased muscle activity as the incoming stimulus became stronger. Lister believed that it was questionable whether the motions of the heart or the intestines are ever checked by the spinal system, except for very brief periods.

Lister conducted a series of experiments using mechanical irritation and galvanism to stimulate the nerves and spinal cord in rabbits and frogs. and due to rabbits active gut movement, he considered them ideal for the experiment. To ensure their gut reflexes weren't impaired, the rabbits weren't anaesthetised. Lister conducted three experiments. In the first experiment, an incision was made in the rabbit's side and a section of intestine was pulled through the skin. Lister then connected a magnetic coil battery to the splanchnic nerves in the spinal cord. When the current was applied, the gut completely relaxed but when the current was applied locally, a small localised contraction occurred that didn't spread to the bowel. Lister stated that "this observation is of fundamental importance, since it proves that the inhibitory influence does not operate directly upon the muscular tissue, but upon the nervous apparatus by which its contractions are, under ordinary circumstances, elicited". In the second experiment, Lister examined the reaction in a section of the bowel, when he restricted the blood supply by tying the vessels and found that there was increase in peristalsis. When he applied current the gut relaxed. He concluded that activity in the gut was under the control of bowel wall nerves and had been stimulated due to loss of blood. In the third experiment he removed the nerves from a section of bowel while ensuring to maintain a good blood supply. This time, stimulation of the section had no effect except when the section would spontaneously contract. The experiment enabled Lister to conclude: "

During the histological study of the bowel wall, Lister discovered a plexus of neurons the myenteric plexus, that confirmed the observations made by Georg Meissner in 1857. Lister concluded, "...it appears that the intestines possess an intrinsic ganglionic apparatus which is in all cases essential to the peristaltic movements, and, while capable of independent action, is liable to be stimulated or checked by other parts of the nervous system".

Although Lister didn't believe in the inhibitory system, he did conclude that extrinsic nerves controlled the intestinal motor function indirectly through their effect on the plexus. It wasn't until 1964 that this was proven by Karl‐Axel Norberg.

Notice of further researches on the coagulation of the blood
Listers third paper on coagulation was a short article in the form of a communication consisting of five pages that was read before the Medico-Chirugical Society of Edinburgh on 16 November 1859. In the paper, Lister found that the coagulation of blood was not solely dependent on the presence of ammonia, but may also be influenced by other factors. In a demonstration before the society, Lister had a sample of horse's blood that had been shed twenty-nine hours earlier and added acetic acid to it. The blood remained fluid despite being acidified, but it eventually coagulated after being left to stand for 15 minutes. Lister demonstrated that the Ammonia theory was incorrect as the coagulation of the blood was not dependent on the presence of ammonia. He concluded that the coagulation of blood may be influenced by other factors in addition to or instead of ammonia, and that the Ammonia theory was fallacious.

Glasgow appointment
On 1 August 1859, Lister wrote to his father to inform him of the ill-health of James A. Lawrie, Regius Professor of Surgery at the University of Glasgow, believing he was close to death. The anatomist Allen Thomson had written to Syme to inform him of Lawrie's condition and that it was his opinion that Lister was the most suitable person for the position. Lister stated that Syme believed he should become a candidate for the position. He went on to discuss the merits of the post; a higher salary, being able to undertake more surgery and being able to create a bigger private practice. Lawrie died on 23 November 1859. In the following month, Lister received a private communication, although baseless, that confirmed he had received the appointment. However, it was clear the matter was not settled when a letter appeared in the Glasgow Herald on 18 January 1860 that discussed a rumour that the decision had been handed over to the Lord Advocate and officials in Edinburgh. The letter annoyed the members of the governing body of Glasgow University, the Senatus Academicus. The matter was referred to the Vice-Chancellor Thomas Barclay that tipped the decision in favour of Lister. On 28 January 1860, Lister's appointment was confirmed.

Glasgow 1860–1869

University life
To be formally induced into the university senatus academicus, Lister had to deliver a Latin oration. In a letter to his father, he described how surprised he was when a letter arrived from Allen Thomson informing him that the thesis had to be presented the next day on 9 March. Lister unable to start the paper until 2am the next night, had only prepared around two thirds of it, when he arrived in Glasgow. The rest was written at Thomson's house. In the letter, he described the dread he felt being admitted into the room prior to presenting the oration. After the thesis was read and Lister was inducted to the senate, he signed a statement not to act contrary to the wishes of the Church of Scotland. While the contents of his thesis have been lost, the title is known, "De Arte Chirurgica Recte Erudienda" ("On the proper way of teaching the art of surgery") .

In early May 1860, the couple made the journey to Glasgow to move into their new house at 17 Woodside Place, at the time on the western edge of the city.  In 1860, university life in Glasgow was lived in the grimy quadrangles of the small college on Glasgow High Street, a mile east of the city centre next to Glasgow Royal Infirmary and the Cathedral and surrounded by the most squalid part of the old medieval city. The Scottish poet and novelist Andrew Lang wrote of his student days at the college, that while Coleridge could smell 75 different stenches during his student days in Cologne, Lang counted more. The city was so polluted the grass didn't grow.

The position of Professor of Surgery at Glasgow was peculiar, as it did not carry with it an appointment as surgeon to the Royal Infirmary, as the university was separate from the hospital. The allotment of surgical wards to the care of the Professor of Surgery depended upon the goodwill of the directors of the infirmary. His predecessor Lawrie never held any hospital appointments at all. Having no patients to care for, Lister immediately began a summer lecture course . He discovered that college classrooms were considered too small and had low ceilings for the number of students, which made them unpleasant to be in when filled to overcrowding. Before his first lecture, the couple cleaned and painted the dingy lecture room assigned to them, at their own expense. He inherited a large class of students from his predecessor that grew rapidly.

After his first session, he wrote favourably of Glasgow:
"The facilities I have here for prosecuting this course as compared to the difficulties I laboured under in Edinburgh are quite delightful —— museums, abundant material and a good library all at my disposal and my colleague Allen Thompson co-operating in the kindest and most valuable manner"

In August 1860, Lister was visited by his parents, who took a "saloon" carriage on the Great Northern Railway.  In September 1860, Marcus Beck came to live with the Lister's and their two servants, while he studied medicine at the university. In the closing weeks of the summer, the Listers along with Beck, Lucy Syme and Ramsay went on a short holiday to Balloch, Loch Lomond. While the group was visiting Tarbet, Argyll, then men rowed across the loch and ascended Ben Lomond.

Election to surgeoncy
In August 1860, Lister had been rejected for a post at the Royal Infirmary by David Smith, a shoemaker who was the chairman of the hospital board. When Lister put his case to Smith explaining the need for anatomical demonstrations so the students could understand the practice of surgery, Smith stated his belief that "the infirmary was a curative institution, not an educational one". The rejection both annoyed and suprised Lister as he had promised by Thomson that the appointment would have been automatic. Indeed, he had informed his father of that fact that the post was guaranteed in his letter to his father.

In November 1860, the winter lecture course began. In total 182 students registered for the lectures and according to Godlee it was likely the "largest class of systematic surgery in Great Britain, if not in Europe". The class consisting of mostly 4th year students with some 3rd and 2nd year students, was so enthused, that they decided to make Lister the Honorary President of their Medical Society. 

When the time approached for the election to the surgeoncy in 1861, 161 students signed a petition on parchment supporting his claim for election.  Lister wasn't elected until 5 August 1861, in what was described by Beck as a "troublesome canvas" and it wasn't until November 1861 that he performed his first public operation.

Croonian Lecture
In 1 January 1863, Lister returned to the topic of coagulation when he presented the Croonian Lecture with the title "On the coagulation of the blood". The prestigious lecture was given at the invitation of the Royal Society and the Royal College of Physicians and was held before the society in London. This was Lister's most important paper on coagulation as it provides a mature and considered view upon the matter, from a professor with a world-wide reputation.

Operation on the wrist that had caries. p.118 Godlee.

Pasteur

In the spring of 1865, while in conversation with Thomas Anderson, the chemistry professor at Glasgow introduced Lister to the latest research of the French chemist Louis Pasteur, who had discovered living things that caused fermentation and putrefaction. At that time, Lister was not a wide reader of continental literature nor of chemical literature, but eventually five of the papers that Pasteur published between 1857 and 1863 would directly influence his work on antiseptics. The first of two papers that Anderson gave to Lister was Sur les corpuscules organisés qui existent dans l'atmosphère, examen de la doctrine des générations spontanées 1861 (On the organized particles that exist in the atmosphere, examination of the doctrine of spontaneous generations) In this paper, Pasteur destroyed the theory of spontaneous generation by proving the hypothesis that life in boiled infusions arose from spores. He also proved that particles in the air could be cultivated; and if they were introduced from the air, into a sterile liquid, they would reappear and multiply in the liquid. The second paper that Lister read that day was Pasteur's magnum opus, titled Examen du rôle attribué au gaz oxygène atmosphérique dans la destruction des matières animales et végétales après la mort 1863 (Examination of the role attributed to atmospheric oxygen gas in the destruction of animal and plant matter after death). that appeared in the journal Comptes rendus hebdomadaires of the French Academy of Sciences on 29 June 1863. The paper concluded that fermination, putrefaction and slow combustion destroyed organic matter and these were necessary processes for life to exist. Pasteur learned that slow combustion was related to the anaerobic conditions that were present, if microorganisms were present.

The first paper that piqued Lister's interest was the Mémoire sur la fermentation appelée lactique (Extrait par l'auteur) (Memoir on the so-called lactic acid fermentation (Extracted by the author)) published in 1857.

The second paper was the Memoire sur la Fermentation Alcoolique (Memoir on Alcoholic Fermentation) that was published in Annales de chimie et de physique in 1860. Pasteur described the living beings, microorganisms in yeast, Saccharomyces cerevisiae that were responsible for the effervescent change that leads to fermentation.

The third paper by Pasteur was the Animalcules infusoires vivant sans gaz oxygène libre et déterminant des fermentations, (Animal Infusoria Living in the Absence of Free Oxygen and their fermentations) The paper that was presented in 1861, was seminal in enabling Lister to understand Sepsis, where the bodies response to infections leads to injury in the tissue and organs. Pasteur's research led him to believe the ferment that produced Butyric acid was a microbe that lived in the absence of oxygen.

Pasteur's experiments influenced Lister development of antiseptics in six different ways. Firstly he discovered that fermination and putrefaction was caused by microbial metabolism; that microbes were abundant in the atmosphere and that each microbes produced a specific type of fermination. The fourth way was the discovery that some microbes derived oxygen from the air, known as aerobic organisms; others known as "anaerobic organisms" absorbed the gas metabolically; that organic or vegetable material, collected as a sterile manner neither fermented nor putrified and lastly, that the theory of spontaneous generation was fallacious.

The discovery was serendipitous, as he read them during the time that he was struggling to control post-surgical infections. Lister was one of the few surgeons who was able to accept Pasteur's conclusions without question. He accepted them as a simple explanation for a problem for which he had long experience. He was now convinced that infection and suppuration of wounds must be due to entry into the wound of minute living airborne creatures. He recognised that contamination was the vector for infection, realising from the first that the surgeons hands, dressings and instruments would also be contaminated. However, Pasteur's work could only confirm the view, which Lister had always expressed that contamination came from the air. Lister didn't realise that it was not the air but the vast number of different microbial life that was responsible. As Lister's work at that time was derived directly from Pasteur's work, Lister probably thought that infection of the wound was due to a single organism. He had no conception, nor indeed did anybody else of the vast number of types of germs that existed in nature. The realisation that occurred after reading the papers, spurred him to determine how the hands, dressings and instruments he used could be rid of these ubiquitous organisms and how the wound could be cleared of them.

Pasteur suggested three methods to eliminate micro-organisms: filtration, exposure to heat, or exposure to chemical solutions. As the first two methods suggested by Pasteur were unsuitable for the treatment of human tissue, Lister experimented with the third idea. Lister was particularly interested in the efficacy of filtration and repeated many of Pasteur experiments in modified form for instruction in his class. To test

In 1871 lister prepared an experiment to  demonstrate to his students that the air carried organisms that could be killed by heating, he modified four flasks, by extending and drawing their necks into a narrow tube that was bent in at an acute angle. Using three of the flasks in an experiment with the fourth used as the control, he filled each with his own fresh urine.

In the control flask the urine quickly became infected with a mould, while the other flasks remained clear and unclouded as the dust and organisms could pass the angular bend.

Lister confirmed Pasteur's conclusions with his own experiments and decided to use his findings to develop antiseptic techniques for wounds.

Phenol
In 1834, Friedlieb Ferdinand Runge discovered phenol, also known as carbolic acid, which he derived in an impure form from coal tar. At that time, there was uncertainty between the substance of creosote – a chemical that had been used as a preservative on wood used for railway sleeper and ships since it protected the wood from rotting – and carbolic acid. Upon hearing that creosote had been used for treating sewage in Carlisle, Lister obtained a sample from Anderson. Known as "German creosote", it was thick, smelly tarry substance.

Lister's earliest experiments in antiseptic treatment were directed at treating compound fractures. 

In March 1865, Lister's began his first experiment with carbolic acid on a 22-year old patient, Neil Kelly who had suffered a severe compound fracture of the leg. His treatment consisted of cleaning the wound of all blood clots then apply the undiluted carbolic acid by the use of forceps across the whole wound. A piece of lint soaked in the acid was then laid on on the leg, overlapping the wound and fixed by an adhesive plaster. A sheet of thin block tin or sheet lead was placed to cover the lint, to prevent the antiseptic evaporating. This was further fixed with adhesive plaster and packing was used between the limb and the splints for the purpose of soaking up any blood or discharges. A crust formed that wasn't removed except to apply new antiseptic. While the treatment possessed many of the essential characteristics of the antiseptic dressings that Lister would subsequently introduce, it was a failure and suppuration began to occur, leading to the death of the patient. 

The disadvantages of the first primitive dressing consisting of lint soaked in carbolic acid, was soon apparent. The German creosote was also far from ideal as it was irritating to the skin causing ulceration and then suppuration that occasionally resulted in tissue necrosis. It was also almost insoluble in water. Lister began to look for another source of phenol. Lister discovered that Frederick Crace Calvert, an honorary chemistry professor from the Royal Manchester Institution was manufacturing small quantities of phenol at a much finer purity and managed to obtain some. The phenol was in the form of small white crystals which liquified at 80 degrees Fahrenheit and was readily soluble in a ratio of 1:20 parts of water and to any extent soluble in oil. The watery solution could be used in a lotion of any strength and be used for disinfection of wounds while the solution in oil that served as a reservoir of antiseptic seemed likely to provide a suitable dressing. Lister began to experiment with the phenol and produced a new dressing made of a putty that consisted of carbonate of lime mixed with phenol and in boiled linseed oil in a ratio of 1:4 or 1:6.

Antiseptic system

History

The history of antiseptic surgery in the years before 1847, was preventing or treating infection in accidental wounds, often received in battle.

James Greenlees
On 12 August 1865, Lister achieved success for the first time when he used full-strength carbolic acid to disinfect a compound fracture. He applied a piece of lint dipped in carbolic acid solution onto the wound of an 11-year-old boy, James Greenlees, who had sustained a compound fracture after a cart wheel had passed over his left leg.  After four days, he renewed the pad and discovered that no infection had developed, and after a total of six weeks he was amazed to discover that the boy's bones had fused back together, without suppuration. 

On 19 May 1866, the first patient to use the improved method was presented at Listers accident ward with a compound fracture with extensive swelling and bruising. The patient was a 21 year-old casting moulder in an iron foundry who was supervising a crane when a chain broken and a metal box containing a sand mould for an iron pipe and weighing 12 hundredweight , fell from a height of four feet and landed obliquely on his left leg. A secondary complication had occurred when air bubbles had mixed with the blood when the man was moved to the hospital. In such a case, the normal treatment would be amputation but Lister decided to treat the wound with phenol. He squeezed the leg to remove as much air and blood as possible. Then he placed a piece of lint soaked in carbolic acid on the wound covered by tin foil. A bloody crust formed over the wound consisting of a scab that was free of bacteria. Lister saw for the first time how the scab was gradually converted into living tissue, even when new carbolic acid was being applied. Something that was entirely new. Unfortunately Hainy developed bed sores that became gangrenous and these were treated with nitric acid to remove the necrotic flesh and carbolic acid to sterlize the wound. Hainy survived the injury. On 27 May, Lister wrote to his father expressing intense satisfaction stating "I tried the application of carbolic acid to the wound, to prevent decomposition of the blood and to prevent the fearful mischief of supparation. It is now eight days since the accident and patient has being going exactly as though the fracture were a simple one." Two weeks later another letter followed reporting "The great swelling has almost entirely subsided and the limb is becoming firm". On 7 August 1866, Hainy was released from hospital.

He subsequently published his results in The Lancet in a series of six articles, running from March through July 1867.
    
Before the publication of these articles, the French doctor Jules Lemaire, in a book from 1863 reprinted in 1865, had already pointed out the antiseptic power of carbolic acid. On 21 September 1867, in the Edinburgh Daily Review, James Young Simpson (using a pseudonym) expressed the idea that Lister's last article was misleading, as it "attribute[d] the first surgical employment of carbolic acid to Professor Lister". Simpson then mentioned Lemaire's work.

Lister instructed surgeons under his responsibility to wear clean gloves and wash their hands before and after operations with five per cent carbolic acid solutions. Instruments were also washed in the same solution and assistants sprayed the solution in the operating theatre. One of his additional suggestions was to stop using porous natural materials in manufacturing the handles of medical instruments.

Lister left Glasgow University in 1869 and was succeeded by George Husband Baird MacLeod. Lister then returned to Edinburgh as successor to Syme as Professor of Surgery at the University of Edinburgh and continued to develop improved methods of antisepsis and asepsis. Amongst those he worked with there, who helped him and his work, was the senior apothecary and later MD, Alexander Gunn. Lister's fame had spread by then, and audiences of 400 often came to hear him lecture. As the germ theory of disease became more understood, it was realised that infection could be better avoided by preventing bacteria from entering wounds in the first place. This led to the rise of aseptic surgery. On the hundredth anniversary of his death, in 2012, Lister was considered by most in the medical field as "the father of modern surgery".

Diffusion of Listerism
Although Lister was so roundly honoured in later life, his ideas about the transmission of infection and the use of antiseptics were widely criticised in his early career. 

The first experimentalist surgeon to question the validity of airborne microorganisms, was the surgeon and professor of medicine at Edinburgh, John Hughes Bennett. In January 1868, Bennet in an lecture for the Edinburgh Medical Journal advanced an alternate theory in the article The Atmospheric Germ Theorythat was in agreement with the theories of Félix Archimède Pouchet, who believed in spontaneous generation of life. In his experiments, Bennet reported that he "proved" that germs generate spontaneously, so one could never create a germ-free environment. It was likely that Hughes Bennett never adequately sterilized his experimental apparatus correctly. On 8 November 1868, Lister gave a lecture on Germ theory, where he elaborated on the origin of germs, as a rebuttal of Bennet's theory. 

In 1869, at the meetings of the British Association at Leeds, Lister's ideas were mocked; and again, in 1873, the medical journal The Lancet warned the entire medical profession against his progressive ideas. However, Lister did have some supporters including Marcus Beck, a consultant surgeon at University College Hospital, who not only practiced Lister's antiseptic technique, but included it in the next edition of one of the main surgical textbooks of the time. 

Lister's use of carbolic acid proved problematic, and he eventually repudiated it for superior methods. The spray irritated eyes and respiratory tracts, and the soaked bandages were suspected of damaging tissue, so his teachings and methods were not always adopted in their entirety. Because his ideas were based on germ theory, which was in its infancy, their adoption was slow. General criticism of his methods was exacerbated by the fact that he found it hard to express himself adequately in writing, so they seemed complicated, unorganised, and impractical.

Edinburgh 1869–1877

In 1870, Lister published "On the Effects of the Antiseptic System of Treatment upon the Salubrity of a Surgical Hospital".

On the 14 January 1871, Lister published his first details of Gauze and Spray in the British Medical Journal.

In 1872 he was elected a member of the Aesculapian Club.

Sprays

Therefore, Lister tested the results of spraying instruments, the surgical incisions, and dressings with a solution of carbolic acid. Lister found that the solution swabbed on wounds remarkably reduced the incidence of gangrene.

London 1877–1900

On 10 February 1877, Scottish surgeon, Sir William Fergusson Chair of Systematic Surgery at King's College Hospital, died. On 18 February, in reply to a tentative approach from a representative of Kings College, Lister stated that he would be willing to accept the Chair on the proviso that he could radically reform the teaching there. There was no doubt that Lister mission was both evangelical and apostolic and this was his true purpose in moving to London.

British surgeon John Wood was originally next in line and was elected to the chair. Wood was hostile to Lister obtaining the chair. On 8 March 1877, in a private letter to an associate, Lister contrasted their differing teaching methods and stated in no uncertain terms his opinion of Fergusson, "The mere fact of Fergusson having held the clinical chair is surely a matter of no great moment". In a comment to another colleague, Lister stated that his goal in taking the appointment was "the thorough working of the antiseptic system with a view to its diffusion in the Metropolis". At a memorial held by his students to persuade him to remain, Lister criticised London teaching. His impromptu speech was heard by a reporter, that ensured it was published in the London and Edinburgh newspapers. This jeopardised Lister's position, as word reached the governing council at King's College, who awarded the chair to John Wood, a few weeks later.

However, negotiations were renewed in May and he was finally elected on 18 June 1877 to a newly created Chair of Clinical Surgery. The second Clinical Surgery Chair was created specifically for Lister, as the hospital feared the negative publicity that would have resulted had Lister not been elected.

Moving to Regents Park
On 11 September 1877, Joseph and Aggie moved to London and the couple found a house at 12 Park Crescent, Regent's Park. Lister began teaching on the first day of October. The hospital made it mandatory that all students should attend Lister's lecturers. Attendance was small compared to the four hundred who would regularly attend his classes in Edinburgh. Lister's conditions of employment were met, but he was only provided with 24 beds, instead of the 60 beds that he was used to in Edinburgh. Lister stipulated that he should be able to bring from Edinburgh four people who would constitute the core of his new staff at the hospital. These were Watson Cheyne who became his assistant surgeon, John Stewart, an anatomical artist and senior assistant, along with W. H. Dobie and James Altham who were Lister's dressers (surgical assistants who dressed wounds). There was considerable friction at Lister's first lecture, both from students who heckled him and staff. Even the nurses were hostile. This was clearly illustrated in October 1877 when a patient, Lizzie Thomas, who travelled from Edinburgh Royal Infirmary to be treated for a Psoas abscess, was not admitted due to not having the correct paperwork. Lister could hardly believe that such a lack of sympathy from imperious nurses could exist. More so, such a state of mind was a real danger to his patients, as it depended on loyal staff to carry out the preparations required for antiseptic surgery.

Introductory address
On 1 October 1877, Lister held the customary introductory address, in essence his inaugural lecture in London, with the subject, "The nature of fermentation". Lister described the fermentation of milk and explained how putrefaction was caused by fermentation of blood and, in the process, tried to prove that all fermentation was due to microorganisms. For his demonstration he used a series of test tubes containing milk that were loosely covered with glass caps. Although air had entered the test tubes and the milk had not decomposed demonstrated that air was responsible for fermentation. The experiment had two conclusions, first that unboiled milk had no tendency to ferment and secondly that an organism that Lister had isolated, Bacterium lactis was the cause of lactic acid fermentation.

The address was badly received. In defence, John Stewart described it as: "a brilliant and most hopeful beginning of what we regarded as a campaign in the enemy's country... There seemed to be a colossal apathy, an inconceivable indifference to the light which, to our minds, shone so brightly, a monstrous inertia to the force of new ideas."

Wiring of fractured patellas

In October 1877, Lister performed an operation on a patient, Francis Smith, that wasn't considered life-threatening. The open operation on a fractured patella, in front of 200 students, involved wiring the two fragments together and was likely the first case in which a healthy knee-joint was ever opened.

In 1881 Lister was elected President of the Clinical Society of London.

In October 1883,  St Clair Thomson gathered together Lister's first seven patients who had knee operations for examination at the Medical Society of London meeting.

He also developed a method of repairing kneecaps with metal wire and improved the technique of mastectomy. He was also known for being the first surgeon to use catgut ligatures, sutures, and rubber drains, and developing an aortic tourniquet. He also introduced a diluted spray of carbolic acid combined with its surgical use, however he abandoned the carbolic acid sprays in the late 1890s after he saw it provided no beneficial change in the outcomes of the surgeries performed with the carbolic acid spray. The only reported reactions were minor symptoms that did not affect the surgical outcome as a whole, like coughing, irritation of the eye, and minor tissue damage among his patients who were exposed to the carbolic acid sprays during the surgery.

Reception abroad (1870–1876)
In 1869, Mathias Saxtorph from the University of Copenhagen visited Lister in Glasgow to adopt his methods. In July 1870, Saxtorph recognised Listers technique as being effective in a letter to Lister where he stated:

The Frederick Hospital, to which I am head surgeon is a very old building and I have 150 patients in the surgical wards. Foremerly, there used to be every year several cases of death from pyaemia, sometime, arising from the most trivial injuries. Now, I have had the satisfaction that not a single case of pyaemia has occurred since I came home last year, which result is certainly owing to the introduction of your antiseptic treatment.

Germany
The first use of Lister's method in Germany was by Karl Thiersch in Leipzig in 1867. Thiersch who practiced Lister's approach since its introduction, never published his results but taught Lister's methods to his students. His house surgeon Hermann Georg Joseph, tested it on 16 patients who had abscesses, with favourable results. Joseph wrote a thesis on his results proving the value of the Lister method, which was presented in Leipzig the following year. In January 1870, Heinrich Adolf von Bardeleben presented a paper to the Berlin Medical Society that described the results but provided no statistical evaluation of those results.

The adoption of Listerism on the European continent was halted during Franco-Prussian War, but it became the greatest opportunity to advance Lister's ideas. At the start of the war, Lister had written a pamphlet known as "A Method of Antiseptic Treatment Applicable To Wounded Soldiers in the Present War" that described a simplified technique of antiseptic that could be used on the battlefield and military hospital. The pamphlet was immediately translated into German, however it never made a material difference.

By far the most important advocate for Lister's antiseptic system in Germany was the surgeon and Osteotomy specialist, Richard von Volkmann who taught at the University of Halle. In August 1870, he became surgeon-general during the Franco-Prussian War and was responsible for 12 army hospitals and 1442 beds. When he returned to his own hospital in the winter of 1871, he found large numbers of patients with infectious diseases throughout the ward. He wrote of the experience:

The mortality after large amputations and complicated fractures grew year by year. In the summer of 1871, during my absence on the battlefield, the clinic was crowded by a large amount of injured. For eight months, in the winter 1871 to 1872, the numbers of blood poisoning and rose disease victims were so great, that I considered applying for a temporary closure of the facility. Without a morgue, the dead stayed in the cellar beneath the wards

In 1872, Volkmann sent his assistant Max Schede to visit Lister at his clinic, to learn his new techniques. Once Schede returned in the autumn of 1872, Volkmann began to use Lister's new techniques. On 16 February 1873, in a letter to Theodor Billroth, Volkmann wrote:

since autumn of last year (1872), I have been experimenting with Lister's method... Already, the first trials in the old 'contaminated' house, show wounds healing, uneventful, without fever and pus.

In April 1874, Volkmann presented a lecturer with the title: "About antiseptic occlusive bandages and their influence on the healing process of wounds" where he detailed the influence of Lister. The lecture became famous in Germany, to such an extent that Lister's antiseptics were established in Germany, faster than in any other developed country. At the German Congress of Surgery, the members were so enthused with the results of Lister's work, that they invited him to visit Germany and see first hand the results of his work. Lister decided to accept the invitation of a continental tour.

In the spring of 1875, Lister along with Agnes, his sister-in-law and two nieces left Edinburgh. The group spent several weeks in a tour that began in Cannes in France, visited the several cities in Italy and a finished with a four-day visit to Venice. The first place in Germany that Lister visited was the "Allgemeines Krankenhaus" (general hospital) in Munich, which was run by Nussbaum. A celebratory dinner was held in Munich for Lister, with seventy guests. However, it was in Leipzig where Lister received his most glorious reception. A banquet was held with between three and four-hundred guests present, led by MC Karl Thiersch. Lister then visited Volkmann in Halle before visiting Berlin, where the group was entertained by Heinrich Adolf von Bardeleben, who worked at the Charité hospital and was one of the earliest adopters of antiseptics.

Later life

In December 1892, Lister attended the celebration in honour of the 70th birthday of Pasteur at the Sorbonne in Paris,  The theatre, designed to hold 2500 people was crowded and included the university governing staff, ministers of state, ambassadors, the President of France Sadi Carnot and representatives from the Institut de France. At 10.30am, Pasteur entered beginning the ceremony. Lister, invited to give the address, received a great ovation when he stood up. In his speech he spoke about the debt that he and surgery owned to Pasteur. In a scene that was captured later by Jean-André Rixens, Pasteur strode forward and kissed Lister on both cheeks. In January 1896, Lister was present when Pasteur's body was laid in his tomb at the Pasteur Institute.

In 1893, four days into their spring holiday in Rapallo, Italy, Agnes Lister died from acute pneumonia. While still responsible for the wards at Kings College Hospital, Lister's private practice ceased along with an appetite for experimental work. Social gatherings were severely curtailed. Studying and writing lost appeal for him and he sank into religious melancholy. On 31 July 1895, Lister retired from Kings College Hospital. Lister was presented with a portrait painted by Scottish artist John Henry Lorimer, in a small presentation, held in recognition of the affection and esteem that felt by his colleagues.

Despite suffering a stroke, he still came into the public light from time to time. He had for several years been a Surgeon Extraordinary to Queen Victoria, and from March 1900 was appointed the Serjeant Surgeon to the Queen, thus becoming the senior surgeon in the Medical Household of the Royal Household of the sovereign. After her death the following year, he was re-appointed as such to her successor, King Edward VII.

On 24 June 1902, with a 10-day history of appendicitis with a distinct mass on the right lower quadrant, Edward was operated on by Sir Frederick Treves two days before his scheduled coronation. Like all internal surgery at the time, the appendectomy needed by the King still posed an extremely high risk of death by post-operational infection, and surgeons did not dare operate without consulting Britain's leading surgical authority. Lister obligingly advised them in the latest antiseptic surgical methods (which they followed to the letter), and the King survived, later telling Lister, "I know that if it had not been for you and your work, I wouldn't be sitting here today."

In 1903, Lister left London to live in the coastal village of Walmer at Park House.

Death 
Lord Lister died on 10 February 1912 at his country home at the age of 84. The first part of Lister's funeral was a large public service held at Westminster Abbey, which took place at 1.30pm on 16 February 1912. His body was moved from his house and taken to The Chapel of St. Faith and a wreath of orchids and lilies was placed by the German ambassador Count Paul Wolff Metternich on behalf of the German Emperor Wilhelm II. Before the start of the service, Frederick Bridge played the music of Henry Purcell, the funeral march by Chopin and Beethoven's Tres Aequili. The body was then placed on a high catafalque, where his Order of Merit, Prussian Pour le Mérite and Grand Cross of the Order of the Dannebrog were placed. It was then borne by several pallbearers including John William Strutt, Archibald Primrose, Rupert Guinness, Archibald Geikie, Donald MacAlister, Watson Cheyne, Godlee and Francis Mitchell Caird where the catafalque was conveyed to Hampstead Cemetery in London, reaching it at 4pm. Lister's body was then buried in a plot in the south-east corner of central chapel, attended by a small group of his family and friends. Many tributes from learned societies all over the world were published in The Times on that day. A memorial service was held in St Giles' Cathedral in Edinburgh on the same day. Glasgow University held a memorial service in Bute Hall on 15 February 1912.

A marble medallion of Lister was placed in the north transept of Westminster Abbey, that sits alongside four other noted men of science, Darwin, Stokes, Adams, and Watt.

Lister Memorial Fund
Following his death, the Lord Lister Memorial Fund was established by the Royal Society as a public subscription to raise monies for the public good in honour of Lord Lister. It led to the founding of the Lister Medal, considered the most prestigious prize that can be awarded to a surgeon.

Awards and honours
On 26 December 1883, Queen Victoria created Lister a baronet, of Park Crescent in the parish of St Marylebone in the county of Middlesex.

In 1885, he was awarded the Pour le Mérite, the highest Prussian order of merit. The order was restricted to 30 living Germans and as many foreigners.

On 8 February 1897, he was further honoured when Her Majesty raised him to the peerage as Baron Lister, of Lyme Regis in the county of Dorset.

In the 1902 Coronation Honours list published on 26 June 1902 (the original day of King Edward VII's coronation), Lord Lister was appointed a privy counsellor and one of the original members of the new Order of Merit (OM). He received the order from the King on 8 August 1902, and was sworn a member of the Privy Council at Buckingham Palace on 11 August 1902.

In December 1902, the King of Denmark bestowed upon Lister the Knight of the Grand Cross of the Order of the Dannebrog, an Order of chivalry that gave him more pleasure than any of his later honours.

Medals
Throughout his life, Lister was awarded a number of medals for his achievements.

In May 1890, Lister was awarded the Cameron Prize for Therapeutics of the University of Edinburgh, that included the delivery of a short oration or lecture, that was held at the Synod Hall in Edinburgh.

Academic societies
Lister was a member of the Royal College of Surgeons of England between 1880 and 1888.

In 1877, Lister was awarded the Cothenius Medal of the German Society of Naturalists. In 1886, he was elected vice president of the college, but declined the nomination for office of president, as he wished to devote his remaining time to further research. In 1887, Lister presented the Bradshaw lecture with a lecture titled "On the Present Position of Antiseptic Treatment in Surgery". In 1897, Lister was awarded the College Gold Medal, their highest honour.

Lister was elected to the Royal Society in 1860. In 1863, Lister presented the Croonian Lecture at the society, "On the Coagulation of the Blood". He served as a trustee on the Royal Society council between 1881 and 1883. Ten years later, in November 1893 Lister was elected for two years, to the position of foreign secretary of the society, succeeding the Scottish geologist Sir Archibald Geikie. In 1895, he was elected president of the Royal Society succeeding Lord Kelvin. He held the position until 1900.

In March 1893, Lister received a telegram from Pasteur, Félix Guyon and Charles Bouchard that informed him he had been elected an associate of the Academie des Sciences.

Monuments and legacy
In 1903, the British Institute of Preventive Medicine was renamed Lister Institute of Preventive Medicine in honour of Lister. The building, along with another adjacent building, forms what is now the Lister Hospital in Chelsea, which opened in 1985. The building at Glasgow Royal Infirmary which houses the cytopathology, microbiology, and pathology departments was named in Lister's honour to recognise his work at the hospital. The Lister Hospital in Stevenage, Hertfordshire is named after him.

Lister's name is one of 23 people featured on the frieze of the London School of Hygiene & Tropical Medicine – although the committee which chose the names to include on the frieze did not provide documentation about why certain names were chosen and others were not.

Lister is one of only two surgeons in the United Kingdom who have the honour of having a public monument in London, Lister and John Hunter.
The statue of Lister, created by Thomas Brock in bronze in 1924, stands at the north end of Portland Place. There is a bronze statue of Lister, mounted on a granite base in Kelvingrove Park, Glasgow that was sculpted by George Henry Paulin in 1924. It sits next to the statue of Lord Kelvin.

The Discovery Expedition of 1901–1904 named the highest point in the Royal Society Range, Antarctica, Mount Lister.

In 1879, Listerine antiseptic (developed as a surgical antiseptic but nowadays best known as a mouthwash) was named by its American inventor, Joseph Lawrence, to honour Lister.

Microorganisms named in his honour include the pathogenic bacterial genus Listeria named by J. H. H. Pirie, typified by the food-borne pathogen Listeria monocytogenes, as well as the slime mould genus Listerella, first described by Eduard Adolf Wilhelm Jahn in 1906.

Lister is depicted in the Academy Award-winning 1936 film The Story of Louis Pasteur, by Halliwell Hobbes. In the film, Lister is one of the beleaguered microbiologist's most noted supporters in the otherwise largely hostile medical community, and is the key speaker in the ceremony in his honour.

Two postage stamps were issued in September 1965 to honour Lister on the centenary of his antiseptic surgery at the Glasgow Royal Infirmary of Greenlees, the first ever recorded instance of such treatment.

Gallery

Bibliography

Papers

Articles on specific events
Article on Lister rolls:
 
Article on Lister collection at the Royal Collection of Surgeons

See also
 Discoveries of anti-bacterial effects of penicillium moulds before Fleming
 Joseph Sampson Gamgee
 Listerine, a mouthwash named after Lister 
 Hector Charles Cameron
 Watson Cheyne
 Museum of Health Care
 List of presidents of the Royal Society

Notes

References

Citations

Bibliography

Articles (journals and proceedings)

Joseph Lister

Louis Pasteur

Books and monographs

Joseph Lister
Two quarto volumes of Lister's collected papers, that were prepared by Sir Hector Charles Cameron, Sir W. Watson Cheyne, Rickman J. Godlee and C. J. Martin, Dawson Williams:

Chapters and contributions

Dictionaries and encyclopedias

Lectures and addresses

Letters

Medical registers

Newspapers

Theses

Websites

External links

 
 
 
 
 The Lister Institute
 Collection of portraits of Lister at the National Portrait Gallery, London
 Statue of Sir Joseph Lister by Louis Linck at The International Museum of Surgical Science in Chicago

1827 births
1912 deaths
19th-century English medical doctors
19th-century surgeons
Academics of King's College London
Academics of the University of Edinburgh
Academics of the University of Glasgow
Alumni of the University of London
Barons in the Peerage of the United Kingdom
English Quakers
English surgeons
Fellows of the Royal Society
Foreign associates of the National Academy of Sciences
Knights Commander of the Royal Victorian Order
Medical hygiene
Members of the Order of Merit
Members of the Privy Council of the United Kingdom
Peers of the United Kingdom created by Queen Victoria
People associated with Edinburgh
People associated with Glasgow
People from West Ham
Presidents of the British Science Association
Presidents of the Royal Society
Recipients of the Copley Medal
Recipients of the Pour le Mérite (civil class)
Royal Medal winners
Members of the Royal Society of Sciences in Uppsala